The 2015 Varsity Cup was contested from 9 February to 13 April 2015. The tournament (also known as the FNB Varsity Cup presented by Steinhoff International for sponsorship reasons) was the eighth season of the Varsity Cup, an annual inter-university rugby union competition featuring eight South African universities.

No team was relegated to the second-tier Varsity Shield competition for 2016.

Competition rules and information

There were eight participating universities in the 2015 Varsity Cup. These teams played each other once over the course of the season, either home or away.

Teams received four points for a win and two points for a draw. Bonus points were awarded to teams that scored four or more tries in a game, as well as to teams that lost a match by seven points or less. Teams were ranked by log points, then points difference (points scored less points conceded).

The top four teams qualified for the title play-offs. In the semi-finals, the team that finished first had home advantage against the team that finished fourth, while the team that finished second had home advantage against the team that finished third. The winners of these semi-finals played each other in the final, at the home venue of the higher-placed team.

There was no relegation to the Varsity Shield at the end of the season.

The 2015 Varsity Cup used a different scoring system than the common scoring system. Tries were worth five points as usual, but conversions were worth three points instead of two, while penalties and drop goals were only worth two points instead of three.

All Varsity Cup games also had two referees officiating each game, props' jerseys featured a special gripping patch to ensure better binding, intended to reduce collapsing scrums and the mark was extended to the entire field.

The Varsity Cup also reintroduced the White Card system from 2015. Under this system, either team's coach or captain could refer incidents for further review, similar to the Umpire Decision Review System used in cricket. They could have incidents reviewed that they believed were either given incorrectly or went unnoticed by the on-field referees. Each team was entitled to one review in each half of the match; if a review proved successful, the team retained their white card review for that half, but if it was unsuccessful, they lost the right to further reviews for the remainder of the half.

Teams

The following teams took part in the 2015 Varsity Cup competition:

Standings

The final league standings for the 2015 Varsity Cup were:

Round-by-round

The table below shows each team's progression throughout the season. For each round, their cumulative points total is shown with the overall log position in brackets:

Fixtures

The 2015 Varsity Cup fixtures were released as follows:

 All times are South African (GMT+2).

Round one

Round two

Round three

Round four

Round five

Round six

Round seven

Semi-finals

Final

Honours

The honour roll for the 2015 Varsity Cup was as follows:

Players

Player statistics

The following table contain points which have been scored in games in the 2015 Varsity Cup season:

Squad lists

The teams released the following squad lists:

Forwards

 Gerard Baard
 Anrich Bitzi
 Daneel Botes
 Fanie Coetzer
 Jozua de Jager
 Jean-Claude Fourie
 Dean Kouprihanoff
 Boetie Maketlo
 Victor Maruping
 Rayno Nel
 JJ Nell
 Len Noort
 Jean Pretorius
 Dean Rossouw
 Jeandré Roux
 Neil Schoombee
 Ian Smith
 Frans Sisita
 Theunis Truter
 Did not play:
 Thabo Chirwa
 Wikus Davis
 Kyle Ess
 Deon Gouws
 Johann Grundlingh
 Carel Frederick Janse van Vuuren
 John Lonergan
 Vincent Maruping
 Ian van Wyk
 Jasper Wiese
Backs

 Luke Cyster
 Jesse du Toit
 Christiaan Erasmus
 Marius Grobler
 Charlie Hitchcock
 Henry Immelman
 Dean Jacobs
 Ali Mgijima
 Lethole Mokoena
 Johannes Nel
 Duan Pretorius
 Mosego Toolo
 Naudé van Biljon
 Arrie Vosloo
 Did not play:
 Heinrich Bitzi
 Chad de Koker
 Noël Marx
 Johan Nel
 Hanro Pretorius
 Werner Rembold
 Makgema Setlaba
 Clinton Toua
Coach

 Skillie Bester
}}

Forwards

 Wesley Adonis
 Justin Benn
 Lungelo Chonco
 Craig Corbett
 AJ de Klerk
 Beyers de Villiers
 Coenraad Fick
 Neethling Gericke
 Migael Grobler
 Ian Groenewald
 Marko Janse van Rensburg
 Derick Linde
 John-Hubert Meyer
 Devon Nash
 Niel Oelofse
 Grant Prior
 Wilhelm van der Sluys
 Jacobus van der Merwe
 Kobus van Dyk
 Janco Venter
 Did not play:
 Human Carstens
 Gareth Theunis de Bruin
 Jacobus de Kock
 Johan Roual de Villiers
 Andreas Rufus Dercksen
 Renier Ehlers
 Athenkosi Gaqa
 Liam Hendricks
 Rees Keene
 Freddie Kirsten
 Boeta Kleinhans
 Basil Liebenberg
 Justin Moberly
 GD Orlam
 Tangeni Sindano Shatiwa
 Willem Jacobus Smith
 Attie Francois van Rensburg
 Willem van Schalkwyk
Backs

 Brandon Asher-Wood
 Craig Barry
 Bjorn Bernardo
 Jamie Joseph
 Kyle Leibrandt
 JP Lewis
 Koos Loubser
 Remu Malan
 Michael Muller
 Jean Nel
 Louis Nel
 Ernst Stapelberg
 Paul Streicher
 Brandon Thomson
 Christoff van Tonder
 Did not play:
 Louis Jordaan
 Christopher James Keet
 William Robin Keet
 Jacquin Adrian Marthinus
 Carlisle Nel
 Ryan Oosthuizen
 Jakobus Putter
 Chris Smit
 Chris Smith
 Kyle Steyn
 Jan Abraham Venter
 Divan Visser
 James Edward Vorster
 Jason Worrall
Coach

 Chris Rossouw
}}

Forwards

 Laurence Christie
 Ivan-John du Preez
 Arno Ebersohn
 Wynand Grassmann
 Rob Louw
 Marzuq Maarman
 Andisa Ntsila
 Philip Odendaal
 Brenden Olivier
 Tyler Paul
 Jody Reyneke
 Steven-Floyd Robbeson
 Elandré van der Merwe
 Dane van der Westhuyzen
 CJ Velleman
 Warrick Venter
 Stephan Zaayman
 Did not play:
 Cody Basson
 Ruben Fourie
 Kevin Kaba
 Marius le Roux
 Sintu Manjezi
 Zaine Marx
 Tyrone Rankin
 Nic Roebeck
Backs

 Enrico Acker
 Tythan Adams
 Ruan Allerston
 Eben Barnard
 Michael Bernardt
 Jarryd Buys
 Steven Hansel
 Andile Jho
 Creswin Joseph
 Devon Lailvaux
 Ivan Ludick
 Khaya Molotana
 Yamkela Ngam
 Brian Skosana
 Did not play:
 Aya Dlepu
 Luan Nieuwoudt
 Juan Smit
 Franswa Ueckermann
 MC Venter
 Lindelwe Zungu
Coach

 David Maidza
}}

Forwards

 Wilmar Arnoldi
 Molotsi Bouwer
 Jaco Buys
 Cayle Denner
 Wian Fourie
 John-Roy Jenkinson
 Danie Jordaan
 Armandt Liebenberg
 Mogau Mabokela
 Loftus Morrison
 Marno Redelinghuys
 Jeandré Rudolph
 Joe Smith
 Walt Steenkamp
 Ruan Venter
 Jacques Vermaak
 Rhyk Welgemoed
 Did not play:
 Jaco Botha
 Joshwine Cornelius
 Funane Mabala
 Mash Mafela
 Lucky Ngcamu
 PJ Uys
Backs

 Rowayne Beukman
 Myburgh Briers
 Johan Deysel
 Warren Gilbert
 Dalen Goliath
 Dillon Smit
 Heinrich Smit
 Rhyno Smith
 Dean Stokes
 Malherbe Swart
 Marnus Tack
 Johnny Welthagen
 Juandré Williams
 Percy Williams
 Did not play:
 Lucian Cupido
 Tiaan Dorfling
 Dries du Plooy
 Arthur Festus
 Sylvian Mahuza
 Henko Marais
 Alvino Montjies
 Akhona Nela
 Luther Obi
 Adriaan Oosthuizen
 Chriswill September
Coach

 Robert du Preez
}}

Forwards

 Guy Alexander
 Mike Botha
 Joel Carew
 Mike Kennedy
 James Kilroe
 Jason Klaasen
 Jade Kriel
 David Maasch
 Robin Murray
 Mark Prior
 Chad Solomon
 Luke Stringer
 Digby Webb
 Kyle Whyte
 Tino Zakeyo
 Msizi Zondi
 Did not play:
 Brad Bosman
 Gareth Ehret
 Sebastian Ferreira
 Olwethu Hans
 Matthew Jones
 Aiden Monk
 Aphiwe Qaba
 Kiernan Allan Rabie
 Duncan Saffy
 Rushdie Salie
 Alva Senderayi
 Joshua John Smallbones
 Devon Stone
 Stuart William Stopforth
 Nyasha Tarusenga
 Samuel Theron
 Keagan Timm
Backs

 James Alexander
 Tom Bednall
 Paul Cohen
 Ryan Dugmore
 Dean Gericke
 Nick Holton
 Nate Nel
 Khanyo Ngcukana
 Brendan Rodgers
 Dylan Sage
 Guy Schwikkard
 Warren Seals
 Richard Stewart
 Lihleli Xoli
 Did not play:
 Greg Alexander
 Daniel Ben Keys Anderson
 Robert Anderson
 Suwi Chibale
 Steven Cullingworth
 Stefano de Gouveia
 Paul Hendry
 Bradley Janse van Rensburg
 Huw Jones
 Karl Brian Martin
 Gianluca Salvador Rizzo
 Sebastian Roodt
 Jarryd Sage
 Justin Scott
 Joel Smith
 Dylan-Lee Tidbury
 Steve Wallace
 Storm Michael Winter
Coach

 Kevin Musikanth
}}

Forwards

 Dolph Botha
 Tienie Burger
 Neil Claassen
 Jacques du Toit
 Elandré Huggett
 Nicolaas Immelman
 Niell Jordaan
 Marco Klopper
 De Wet Kruger
 Daniel Maartens
 Steven Meiring
 Chase Morison
 Ox Nché
 Teunis Nieuwoudt
 Gerhard Olivier
 Fiffy Rampeta
 Hennie-Schalk Theron
 Joe van der Hoogt
 Conraad van Vuuren
 Boela Venter
 Henco Venter
 Did not play:
 Murray Bondesio
 Armandt Koster
 Markus Odendaal
 Justin Pappin
 Ockie van Zyl
Backs

 Renier Botha
 AJ Coertzen
 JP Coetzee
 Maphutha Dolo
 Kay-Kay Hlongwane
 Stephan Janse van Rensburg
 Tertius Kruger
 Nico Lee
 Vuyani Maqina
 Niel Marais
 Marco Mason
 Zee Mkhabela
 Arthur Williams
 Did not play:
 Pieter-Steyn de Wet
 Ludwig Erasmus
 Tanaks Takudzwa Matsinde
 Francois Pretorius
Coach

 Franco Smith
}}

| basestyle =

Forwards

 David Antonites
 Wian Conradie
 Nico du Plessis
 Brandon Landsberg
 Werner Lourens
 Gareth Milasinovich
 Etienne Oosthuizen
 Dylan Peterson
 Kobus Porter
 Phanta Qinisile
 Raeez Salie
 Baksteen Snyman
 Kyle van Dalen
 Griffith van Wyk
 Did not play:
 Dillon Bakos
 Steven Barber
 Pieter Jansen
 Jeremy Jordaan
 Kyle Kruger
 Ruan Macdonald
 Tiaan Macdonald
 Vernon Petersen
 Achmad Salie
 Victor Sekekete
 Waldo Weideman
Backs

 Ronald Brown
 Jamie Campbell
 Robert de Bruyn
 Aphiwe Dyantyi
 Chuma Faas
 Jaco Fourie
 Dominic Kroezen
 Bradley Moolman
 Hilton Mudariki
 Andries Oosthuizen
 Adrian Vermeulen
 Did not play:
 Kofi Appiah
 JJ de Klerk
 Kallie Erasmus
 Selom Gavor
 Thato Marobela
 Divan Johannes Nel
 Jacques Nel
 Godfrey Ramaboea
 Lukas van Zyl
 PJ Walters
Coach

 Skollie Janse van Rensburg
}}

Forwards

 Andrew Beerwinkel
 Clyde Davids
 Jan Enslin
 Justin Forwood
 Neethling Fouché
 Irné Herbst
 Reniel Hugo
 Pieter Jansen van Vuren 
 Jason Jenkins
 Jannes Kirsten
 Wiaan Liebenberg
 Nqoba Mxoli
 Juan Schoeman
 Rudolph Smith
 Ruan Steenkamp
 Jan van der Merwe
 Dayan van der Westhuizen
 Heinrich Viljoen
 Jaco Visagie
 Dennis Visser
 Did not play:
 Derek Botha
 Wesley Cloete
 Christiaan de Bruin
 Corniel Els
 Pieter Johan Griesel
 Primo Ncube
Backs

 Riaan Britz
 Dewald Human
 JT Jackson
 Jermaine Kleinsmith
 Dan Kriel
 Adrian Maebane
 Duncan Matthews
 Ryan Nell
 Jacques Rossouw
 Joshua Stander
 Emile Temperman
 Damian van Wyk
 André Warner
 Did not play:
 Wesley Cupido
 Carlo Engelbrecht
 Andries Jacobus Kruger
 Kefentse Mahlo
 Ganfried May
 JP Smith
 Jade Stighling
 Francois Tredoux
 Leighton van Wyk
 Impi Visser
Coach

 Pote Human
}}

Discipline

The following table contains all the cards handed out during the tournament:

Dream Team

After the 2015 Varsity Cup, a Varsity Cup Dream Team was announced. This team would play against the South Africa Under-20s in Stellenbosch on 21 April 2015. The head coach of the champions , Franco Smith, was appointed as the coach of the side and  lock Reniel Hugo was appointed as captain. Inny Radebe, who played for the 2015 Varsity Shield champions  was also named in the squad.

Dan Kriel and Jaco Visagie were originally selected in the 2015 Varsity Cup Dream Team, but subsequently replaced by Johan Deysel and Elandré Huggett respectively.

The Dream Team made the early running in the match, with two first-half tries – a penalty try and a try by full-back Rhyno Smith – giving them a 12–10 half-time lead over the South African Under-20s. Second-half tries by Dillon Smit and Elandré Huggett proved to not be enough, with the South African Under-20s running out 31–24 winners.

Referees

The following referees officiated matches in the 2015 Varsity Cup:

 Rodney Boneparte
 Ben Crouse
 Stephan Geldenhuys
 Quinton Immelman
 Cwengile Jadezweni
 Jaco Kotze
 Pro Legoete
 Tahla Ntshakaza
 Francois Pretorius
 Jaco Pretorius
 Oregopotse Rametsi
 Archie Sehlako
 Lourens van der Merwe
 Marius van der Westhuizen

See also

 Varsity Cup
 2015 Varsity Rugby
 2015 Varsity Shield
 2015 SARU Community Cup
 2015 Vodacom Cup

References

External links
 
 

2015
2015 in South African rugby union
2015 rugby union tournaments for clubs